Yan Huilian (born 18 June 1983) is a Chinese archer. She won individual event in the 2012 Summer Paralympics and was second in the team event.

References

1983 births
Living people
Archers at the 2012 Summer Paralympics
Paralympic gold medalists for China
Paralympic silver medalists for China
Chinese female archers
Medalists at the 2012 Summer Paralympics
Paralympic medalists in archery
Paralympic archers of China
21st-century Chinese women